Deabeas Owusu-Sekyere (born 4 November 1999) is a Dutch-born footballer of Ghanaian descent who plays as a forward for Chinese Super League club Cangzhou Mighty Lions.

Club career
Owusu-Sekyere started his career at Ajax youth academy. After that, he joined the youth academy of Leixões.

In 2021, he joined Estonian club Paide Linnameeskond.

In August 2022, he moved to Chinese club Cangzhou Mighty Lions.

Career statistics 
Statistics accurate as of match played 18 December 2022.

 1.Includes Estonian Cup and Chinese FA Cup.
 2.Includes UEFA Europa League and UEFA Europa Conference League.
 3.Includes Estonian Supercup.

Honours

Club 

 Estonian Cup: 2021–22.

References

External links
 

Dutch people of Ghanaian descent
Dutch footballers
People from Utrecht (city)
Cangzhou Mighty Lions F.C. players
Paide Linnameeskond players
1999 births
Living people
Association football forwards
Meistriliiga players
Esiliiga players
Dutch expatriate footballers
Expatriate footballers in Portugal
Expatriate footballers in Estonia
Expatriate footballers in China
Dutch expatriate sportspeople in Portugal
Dutch expatriate sportspeople in Estonia
Dutch expatriate sportspeople in China